Breakdown is the fourth solo album by Brazilian percussionist Paulinho Da Costa released in 1991, recorded for A&M Records.

Track listing
"Say It Now, 'Freedom'" (Paulinho da Costa, Erich Bulling, Jeffrey B. Hull, Peter Canada) – 6:07
"One Step Two Step" (Erich Bulling, Paulinho Da Costa, Debbie Franco) – 3:42
"Guaruja" (Paulinho Da Costa, Erich Bulling, Peter Canada) – 4:58
"I Believe You" (Erich Bulling, Viqui Denman) – 4:04
"Sabor Latino" (Paulinho Da Costa, Erich Bulling) – 4:01
"Let's Stay Friends" (Paulinho Da Costa, Erich Bulling, Peter Canada) – 5:09
"No Way Out" (Erich Bulling, Paulinho Da Costa, Peter Canada) – 4:06
"This Love's For Keeps" (Erich Bulling, Paulinho Da Costa, Peter Canada) – 3:49
"Real Love" featuring Marsha Skidmore on vocals (Erich Bulling, Viqui Denman) – 4:05
"You Can Love Me" (Paulinho Da Costa, Erich Bulling, Viqui Denman) – 3:44
"Going North" (Paulinho Da Costa/Erich Bulling/Viqui Denman) – 3:24
"Exotica" (Paulinho Da Costa, Erich Bulling, Viqui Denman) – 5:00

Personnel
Paulinho Da Costa - percussion, drums
Erich Bulling - keyboards
Larry Williams - tenor saxophone
George Duke - keyboard solo
Paul Jackson, Jr. - guitar
Andy Narell - steel drums
Nathan East - bass 
Marcus Miller - bass
Bill Reichenbach, Rick Culver - trombone
Jerry Hey, Gary Grant - trumpet
Herb Alpert - trumpet
Carlos Rios - Guitar
Gerald Albright - soprano saxophone
Duilio Cosenza - cavaquinho
Darryl Phinnessee, Jimmy Varner, Kenny O'Brien, Marsha Skidmore, Myrian Rios, Peter Canada – lead vocals
Darryl Phinnessee, Erich Bulling, Isela Sotelo, Jimmy Varner, Julia Waters, Kenny O'Brien, Luther Waters, Maria Del Rey, Marsha Skidmore, Maxine Waters, Oren Waters, Paulinho Da Costa, Paulo Da Costa, Peter Canada, Philip Bailey - backing vocals

Production
Paulinho Da Costa - Producer 
Erich Bulling - Producer and engineer
Csaba Petocz, Steve Sykes - Mixing 
Eric Rudd - Engineer
Briant Arnett - Assistant Engineer:
Bernie Grundman - Mastering 
Chuck Beeson, Rowan Moore - Art Direction and design
Bret Lopez - Photography
Mimi De - Blasio stylist

References

External links
Paulinho Da Costa at A&M Records
Paulinho Da Costa at Discogs

1987 albums
A&M Records albums
Paulinho da Costa albums